The Calgary Colts are a Canadian Junior Football team based in Calgary, Alberta. The Colts play in the six-team Prairie Football Conference, which itself is part of the Canadian Junior Football League (CJFL) and competes annually for the national title known as the Canadian Bowl. The Colts were founded in 1967 and are two time National Champions (1989, 1990)

Staff
Head Coach: Greg DeLaval
Offensive Coordinator: TBD
Special Teams Coach:  TBD
Receivers:  TBD
Quarterbacks: TBD
Running Backs: TBD
Linebackers: TBD
Defensive Backs: TBD
Defensive Assistant: TBD
Offensive Assistant: TBD
Receivers Coach: TBD
Defensive D-Line Coach: TBD

External links 
 Calgary Colts homepage
 Canadian Junior Football League

References

Canadian Junior Football League teams
Col
1967 establishments in Alberta
Sports clubs established in 1967